Aganoptila durata is a moth in the family Cosmopterigidae. It was described by Edward Meyrick in 1922. It is found in India.

References

Natural History Museum Lepidoptera generic names catalog

Cosmopterigidae
Moths described in 1922
Moths of Asia